Boris Grigoryevich Onishchenko (Russian and , ; also transliterated as Onyshchenko, Onishenko, Onischenko; born 19 September 1937) is a former Soviet modern pentathlete who competed at the 1968, 1972 and 1976 Summer Olympics. 

He was a member of the Soviet gold medal team in the 1972 Olympics.  From 1967 to 1974, he competed in six World Modern Pentathlon Championships, winning gold five times as an individual or as part of the Soviet squad.  He is best known for his disqualification from the 1976 Summer Olympics and subsequent lifetime ban for cheating by means of an illegally modified épée.

Life and career
Onishchenko was born in 1937 in a village of Khorol Raion, Poltava Oblast, Ukrainian S.S.R. He was a strong swimmer early on and taught at the Dynamo Sports Club.  

His first world competition was at the 1967 World Modern Pentathlon Championships where he competed with Stasys Šaparnis and Edvard Sdobnikov.  The Soviet team won a bronze medal at the event.  The following year, he took a silver medal at the 1968 Mexico City Olympics with Šaparnis and Pavel Lednyov.  He went on to win gold five times at the world championships, one as an individual.  In 1971, he was awarded the Merited Master of Sports and in 1972, he received the Order of the Red Banner of Labour.

In the 1972 Olympics in Munich, he competed with the Soviet team of Lednyov and Vladimir Shmelyov that captured the gold.  Onishchenko himself took an individual silver medal in the event, finishing behind András Balczó of Hungary.

1976 Olympics

In 1976, the 38-year old Onishchenko entered the Olympics as a three-time world champion but never having won the gold as an individual. Onishchenko was a top fencer and had won gold in the 1974 World Modern Pentathlon Championships in Moscow.  Although he was rated fourth, which would relegate him to being a reserve, Onishchenko won a preliminary tournament in the Soviet Union that pushed him onto the team.

After the first event of the pentathlon, the Soviet team found itself in fourth place, trailing closely behind Britain. Fencing was the next event: a one-touch épée tournament. During Onishchenko's bout with British team captain Jim Fox, the British team protested that Onishchenko's weapon had gone off without actually hitting anything. In fact, Onishchenko's épée was in the air away from Fox when the hit was registered.

Fox requested an examination of Onishchenko's weapon, which was found to be faulty, resulting in points being deducted from Onishchenko's score. However, the British team filed an official protest and demanded further examination. The bout was allowed to continue, and he won by a large margin.

In electric épée fencing, a touch is registered on the scoring box when the tip of the weapon is depressed with a force of 750 grams, completing a circuit formed by the weapon, body cord, and box. It was found that Onischenko's épée had been illegally modified to include a switch that allowed him to close this circuit without actually depressing the tip of his weapon, so he could register a touch without making any contact on his opponent. Onischenko was ejected from the competition, which forced the Soviet Union to scratch from the team event. The British team that exposed Onishchenko went on to win the gold medal.

Newspapers decried him as "Disonischenko" and "Boris the Cheat". Two months later it was reported he had been called before Soviet leader Leonid Brezhnev for a personal scolding.

Post-fencing life
After his lifetime ban from the sport that was issued by the International Olympic Committee, Onishchenko worked as a taxi driver in Kyiv and competed in Soviet national events.

External links 
The story on Boris Onishchenko in Sports Illustrated 2020.

References

1937 births
Living people
Ukrainian male modern pentathletes
Soviet male modern pentathletes
Modern pentathletes at the 1968 Summer Olympics
Modern pentathletes at the 1972 Summer Olympics
Modern pentathletes at the 1976 Summer Olympics
Olympic modern pentathletes of the Soviet Union
Olympic gold medalists for the Soviet Union
Olympic silver medalists for the Soviet Union
Olympic medalists in modern pentathlon
Sportspeople from Kyiv
Medalists at the 1972 Summer Olympics
Medalists at the 1968 Summer Olympics
Soviet Army officers
Sportspeople banned for life
Cheating in sports